Mojtaba Majid Esmaeilzadeh Mollasaraei (born 8 December 1990) is an Iranian professional footballer who plays as a forward for Gilanmehr Fouman.

Career
Esmaeilzadeh began playing with Yazd Louleh during the 2013–14 Azadegan League, making his debut against Pas Hamedan on 11 October 2013; prior to netting his first goal two appearances later versus Rahian Kermanshah. Overall, he scored twice in twenty fixtures. In the following campaign, Yazd Louleh's Azadegan League licence was removed and given to Tarbiat Yazd - Esmaeilzadeh subsequently made the move to Tarbiat Yazd for 2014–15. He departed in 2015 for a short spell with Giti Pasand, which yielded two appearances. Esmaeilzadeh spent the end of the 2015–16 campaign with Sepidrood of League 2.

Sepidrood won promotion in 2015–16, though Esmaeilzadeh left the club soon after to play for the Azadegan League's Foolad Yazd. He was on the books of Foolad Yazd throughout 2016–17, which ended with relegation to League 2. He subsequently had a five-month stint with Iranjavan. In January 2018, Esmaeilzadeh left Iranian football for the first time to play with Brunei-based Singapore Premier League side DPMM FC. He netted two goals in his opening three fixtures with DPMM, scoring goals in wins over Home United and Geylang International. He left in October after four goals in sixteen appearances.

In 2019, Esmaeilzadeh began featuring for Gilanmehr Fouman.

Career statistics
.

References

External links

1990 births
Living people
People from Rasht
Iranian footballers
Association football forwards
Iranian expatriate footballers
Expatriate footballers in Brunei

Singapore Premier League players
Yazd Louleh F.C. players
Tarbiat Yazd players
Giti Pasand players
Sepidrood Rasht players
Foolad Yazd players
Iranjavan players
DPMM FC players

Sportspeople from Gilan province